Hedriodiscus truquii is a species of soldier fly in the family Stratiomyidae.

Distribution
United States, El Salvador, Mexico.

References

Stratiomyidae
Insects described in 1859
Taxa named by Luigi Bellardi
Diptera of North America